The election for Resident Commissioner to the United States House of Representatives took place on November 7, 1972, the same day as the larger Puerto Rican general election and the United States elections, 1972.

Candidates for Resident Commissioner
 Jaime Benitez for the Popular Democratic Party
 Luis F. Camacho for the Puerto Rican People's Party
 Jorge Luis Córdova for the New Progressive Party
 Jorge Morales-Yordan for the Puerto Rican Independence Party

Election results

See also 
Puerto Rican general election, 1972

References 

1972 Puerto Rico elections
Puerto Rico
1972